Spit MacPhee is a 1988 Australian mini-series set in the 1930s and based on the novel by James Aldridge.

References

External links
Spit MacPhee at IMDb

1980s Australian television miniseries
1988 Australian television series debuts
1988 Australian television series endings
1988 television films
1988 films